School District 67 Okanagan Skaha is a school district in the Okanagan region of British Columbia. It operates the public schools in Penticton and Summerland.

History
School District 67 was created by the merger of the Summerland and Penticton School Districts in 1996.

Schools

See also
List of school districts in British Columbia

Penticton
School districts in the Okanagan
67